Constantin Corduneanu (born 23 April 1969) is a Romanian former freestyle wrestler who competed in the 1992 Summer Olympics and in the 1996 Summer Olympics.

Life
Born into a poor family with eleven children, Corduneanu started wrestling at the Nicolina Sports Club in his hometown, Iași.

During his active wrestling career he was a member of Steaua Bucharest and Dinamo Brașov, where he was a non-commissioned officer.

He retired from wrestling in 2002, but before that he had become the leader of a Mafia-type criminal organization in Iași. In 2018, he was indicted along Dragos Cosmin Gradinariu AKA Bombardieru for the "establishment of an organized criminal group, leading and financing illegal drug activities, and illegal trafficking of high-risk drugs", but was found not guilty by Romania's Supreme Court in 2013.

When he married his second wife, Alina Bogdan, he changed his family name into Bogdan, but reverted to the old family name after they divorced.
In 2015, he had a song dedicated for him and his brother, Adrian Corduneanu (aka Beleaua), named Mafia. The artist who sings it is Dani Mocanu, well known manele singer.

References

External links
 

1969 births
Living people
Olympic wrestlers of Romania
Wrestlers at the 1992 Summer Olympics
Wrestlers at the 1996 Summer Olympics
Romanian male sport wrestlers
Sportspeople from Iași